"Rotterdam plus" or "Rotterdam +" is a methodology (formula) for determining the steam coal's price for thermal power plants, based on import parity principle, which was used to forecast the wholesale market price of electricity. The formula was in application in Ukraine from May 2016 to June 2019.

The formula was adopted on March 3, 2016 by Ukrainian national energy regulator, National Commission for Regulation of Energy and Utilities and automatically became invalid from July 1, 2019, due to the entry into force of the law "On electricity market.”

Etymology 
In media new methodology was named "Rotterdam plus". In this verbal construction “Rotterdam” means coal index price, and "plus" means logistic costs for delivering coal from port of Rotterdam to Ukraine's thermal power plants.

History and prerequisites 
Due to the hostilities in certain areas of Donetsk and Luhansk regions, Ukraine lost control of 88 coal mines, which was 60% of the total number of mines in the country. Coal production in 2015 decreased by 38.8% (by 25.2 million tons) compared to 2014 - to 39.8 million tons.

Ukraine faced a shortage of anthracite (hard coal) grades before the heating season of 2014–2015. Thus, in the fall of 2014, anthracite was imported for the first time from South Africa.

In 2015, according to the State Statistics Service, Ukraine imported 14.6 million tons of coal worth $1.63 billion. Of these, 1.07 million tons of anthracite coal was imported at 99.6 million US dollars.

The current tariff for electricity supply by thermal power plants did not cover the cost of purchasing imported coal. The coal price in that time was manually set by the Ministry of Energy and Coal Industry.

The new methodology to forecast wholesale market price of electricity calculating with the market determination of coal price was supposed to ensure the independence of thermal power plants from coal supplies from the ATO zone and deprive Ukraine from problems with the accumulation sufficient amount of coal in front the heating season.

General principle 
According to the methodology, the National Commission for Regulation of Energy and Utilities calculated the forecasted wholesale price for electricity in such a way that the tariff for electricity produced by the thermal power plants would cover its cost.

The formula for determining the price consisted of the average price indices for thermal coal in the ports of northwestern Europe (Amsterdam-Rotterdam-Antwerp) for the 12 months preceding the calculation of the FWP, plus logistics costs for the delivery of coal to Ukrainian thermal power plants.

The APІ2 index had been adjusted according to calorific value of Ukrainian coal, which was indicated in the predicted fuel structure for thermal power plants. This document was approved by the Ministry of Energy.

The logistic costs were based on the average freight rate for the delivery coal from the ARA region to Ukrainian ports, the cost of transshipment in the port (unloading the vessel) and the average railway tariff for shipping coal from the port to the thermal power plants.

The “Rotterdam +” formula did not assume that coal would be physically purchased in Rotterdam and transported to the Ukrainian port “Pivdenny” (Odessa region). The APІ2 index was used as an indicative of the European market, and the logistics costs according to the formula were to cover the costs of delivering coal from producing countries - South Africa, Colombia, the US and Australia - to Ukraine.

This approach was justified by the European Coal and Lignite Association (EURACOAL) calculations . According to the Association, the cost of delivering coal from South Africa, the United States and Colombia to Ukraine were higher than from these countries in the ARA region.

Critics and media-campaign against “Rotterdam+” 
The main opponents of the formula for determining the market price of coal were large energy-intensive enterprises - mainly ferroalloy and electrometallurgical enterprises, which belong to oligarchs Igor Kolomoisky and Viktor Pinchuk.

In 2017, they established the Electricity and Utilities Consumers Association. Officially, the members of the association did not open up. According to the former head of the association, Andriy Gerus, large electricity consumers have joined the association

Andriy Gerus has become a key figure in the anti-formula media campaign. Media support was provided by Ihor Kolomoisky's 1 + 1 Media TV channel, as well as by Viktor Pinchuk's ICTV and STB.

In March 2018, a public organization controlled by Gerus, the Association of Energy and Utilities Consumers, launched the Rotterdam Plus online meter to calculate the amount of overpayments by consumers for electricity expected by it. Despite the cancellation of the "Rotterdam +" formula from July 1, 2019, the counter continues to count losses to the present. As of early August 2020, he calculated losses at over UAH 67 billion.

The object of criticism and media attacks was the DTEK holding, the largest coal producer and operator the majority of thermal power plants[7]. TV channels controlled by Kolomoisky and Pinchuk accused DTEK of receiving super-profits. Since the owner of 100% of DTEK shares is entrepreneur Rinat Akhmetov, criticism was also directed at him.

Criminal investigation 
A year after the adoption of the formula, the National Anti-Corruption Bureau, under pressure from a media campaign, opened criminal proceedings against members of the National Commission for Regulation of Energy and Utilities, who adopted the methodology.

During the investigation, NACB conducted several searches, including with the equipment seizure from NEURC.

In the course of 3.5 years, 10 Ukrainian and 4 international examinations were carried out, which, according to the lawyers, did not reveal any harm or loss from the formula.

Termination of investigation 
The investigation lasted 3.5 years and was closed on August 27, 2020 due to the lack of evidence of the suspects' guilt and crimes in their actions.

On September 24, the legality of closing a case was confirmed by the Supreme Anti-Corruption Court. Ad on September 29 - by the Office of the General Prosecutor.

The meaning and impact 
The introduction of "Rotterdam+" methodology for determining the coal market price was a transitional stage before the introduction of a full-fledged electricity market in Ukraine from July 1, 2019.

According to the former head of the NERC and a member of the NERC, Alexander Rogozin, the "Rotterdam+" formula in 2016 was the best possible option for calculation coal price in the transition period before opening of electricity market.

According to economists, the formula provided the formation of steam coal prices with the principle of import parity, which was agreed with international financial institutions, including the IMF.

Antimonopoly Committee's conclusions about the "Rotterdam+" formula 
On December 18, 2020, the Antimonopoly Committee of Ukraine closed its own investigation about the "Rotterdam+" formula.

The Antimonopoly Committee officially established that the "Rotterdam+" formula did not harm electricity consumers in Ukraine

Re-closure of criminal investigation 
On January 21, 2021, the National Anti-Corruption Bureau announced the re-closure of the "Rotterdam+" case. Soon this information was confirmed by the Specialized Anti-Corruption Prosecutor's Office. This decision was overturned by a higher-level prosecutor and a court.

On April 10, 2021, the head of the Rotterdam plus prosecutors' group, Vitaliy Ponomarenko, closed the case for the third time. The National Anti-Corruption Bureau announced immediately that it would appeal this decision again.

On May 5, 2021, the Attorney General's Office replaced the procedural leader in the "Rotterdam+" case. The new prosecutor on May 20, after studying 100 volumes of the case and 350 GB of video materials, interrogations, decided to close the case.

References 

Pricing controversies
Electricity economics
Coal in Ukraine